Alphaea fulvohirta is a moth of the family Erebidae. It was described by Francis Walker in 1855. It is found in China (Sichuan, Tibet, Shaanxi), Nepal, Bhutan and India (Sikkim, Assam).

References

Moths described in 1855
Spilosomina
Moths of Asia